Zanthoxylum scandens is a woody plant from the family Rutaceae.

Description
Zanthoxylum scandens is a woody plant, observed as a shrub or woody climber. Geographically, the species has been spotted in areas within South Anhui, Chongqing, Fujian, Guangdong, Guangxi, Guizhou, Hainan, Hubei, Hunan, Jiangxi, Sichuan, Taiwan, Yunnan, Zhejiang, India, Indonesia, Japan, Malaysia, Myanmar, Laos, and Vietnam.

Prickles can be found on its trunks, branches, branchlets, and leaf rachises. Flowers are tetramerous, with a perianth in two series. Male flowers have four stamens, are about three to four millimeters in size, and have a spot at their apex. Female flowers have three carpels with ligulate staminodes. Fruit follicles have been observed as purplish red in color, but grayish brown to black when dry. Seeds are about four to five millimeters in diameter. The species typically flowers from March to May, and fruits from to July to August.

Classification
The species was first published in Carl Ludwig von Blume's Bijdragen tot de Flora van Nederlandsch Indie in 1825. It has widely been accepted as a species, including in Flora of Japan II (Iwatsuki, K., Boufford, D.E. & Ohba, H., 1999), A Checklist of the Trees, Shrubs, Herbs and Climbers of Myanmar (Kress, W.J., DeFilipps, R.A., Farr, E. & Kyi, D.Y.Y., 2003),  Danh lục các loài thực vật Việt Nam (Lê, T.C., 2003), Check-List of Flora of Meghalaya (Mao, A.A., Sinha, B.K., Verma, D. & Sarma, N., 2016),  Bokor National Park A picture guide of forest trees in Cambodia (Tagane, S. & al., 2017), and Flora of China. (Wu, Z. & Raven, P.H., 2008). 

529 occurrences have been officially recorded. Three specimens are kept at the Royal Botanic Gardens, Kew. 

Twelve potential synonyms have been identified, including Fagara chinensis, Fagara cuspidata, Fagara cyrtorhachia, Fagara laxifoliolata, Fagara leiorhachia, Fagara scandens, Zanthoxylum chinense, Zanthoxylum cuspidatum, Zanthoxylum cyrtorbachium, Zanthoxylum laxifoliolatum, Zanthoxylum leiorhachium and Zanthoxylum liukiuense.

References

scandens
Flora of China